{{DISPLAYTITLE:C22H16N4O}}
The molecular formula C22H16N4O (molar mass: 352.39 g/mol, exact mass: 352.1324 u) may refer to:

 Sudan III

Molecular formulas